Pietro Antonio Bernabei, M.D. (born 13 March 1948) is an Italian painter notable for his concept of bioarte.

A native of Florence, Pietro Antonio Bernabei has, since 1990, focused his artistic research on life's biological image and its functional aspects, searching for cross-references which unite and disunite art and life sciences. To define his artistic work, he introduced, in 2000, the idea of bioarte (the Italian word corresponds to BioArt in English).

References

External links
 Pietro Antonio Bernabei's Website

Painters from Florence
Living people
1948 births
BioArtists